Muttsee is a reservoir in the Canton of Glarus, Switzerland. It is used as the upper reservoir in the 1 GW pumped-storage hydroelectricity Linth–Limmern Power Stations.

The 2.4 km high altitude permits a 2.2 MW solar farm to supply 3.3 GWh per year, more than average power, even in winter (as the high altitude prevents fog formation, and as the snow reflects the sunlight onto the solar panels). The 6,000 photovoltaic panels were installed on the containment wall of the artificial basin in 2021, covering approximately 10,000 square meters of concrete, and stretching over almost 1 km.

See also
List of lakes of Switzerland
List of mountain lakes of Switzerland

References

Reservoirs in Switzerland
Lakes of the canton of Glarus
LMuttsee